The Europe/Africa Zone was one of three zones of regional competition in the 2005 Fed Cup.

Group I
Venue: Club Ali Bey, Manavgat, Antalya, Turkey (outdoor clay)
Dates: 20–23 April

The sixteen teams were divided into four pools of four teams. The top teams of each pool played-off against each other to decide which two nations progress to World Group II Play-offs. The four nations coming last played-off against each other to decide which teams are relegated to Group II for 2006.

Pools

Play-offs

  and  advanced to World Group II Play-offs.

Group II
Venue: Club Ali Bey, Manavgat, Antalya, Turkey (outdoor hard)
Dates: 27–30 April

The eight teams were divided into two pools of four teams. The top two teams of each pool played-off against each other to decide which two nations progress to Group I for 2006. The four nations coming last played-off against each other to decide which teams are relegated to Group III for the next year.

Pools

Play-offs

  and  advanced to Group I for 2006.

Group III
Venue: Club Ali Bey, Manavgat, Antalya, Turkey (outdoor hard)
Dates: 27–30 April

The twelve teams were divided into four pools of three teams. The top team of each pool played-off against each other to decide which two nations progress to Group II for 2006.

Pools

Play-offs

  and  advanced to Group II for 2006.

See also
Fed Cup structure

References

 Fed Cup Profile, Bulgaria
 Fed Cup Profile, South Africa
 Fed Cup Profile, Hungary
 Fed Cup Profile, Sweden
 Fed Cup Profile, Luxembourg
 Fed Cup Profile, Poland
 Fed Cup Profile, Slovenia
 Fed Cup Profile, Denmark
 Fed Cup Profile, Great Britain
 Fed Cup Profile, Israel
 Fed Cup Profile, Ukraine
 Fed Cup Profile, Romania
 Fed Cup Profile, Finland
 Fed Cup Profile, Lithuania
 Fed Cup Profile, Georgia
 Fed Cup Profile, Latvia
 Fed Cup Profile, Ireland
 Fed Cup Profile, Turkey
 Fed Cup Profile, Egypt
 Fed Cup Profile, Botswana
 Fed Cup Profile, Iceland
 Fed Cup Profile, Bosnia and Herzegovina
 Fed Cup Profile, Namibia
 Fed Cup Profile, Moldova
 Fed Cup Profile, Kenya

External links
 Fed Cup website

 
Europe Africa
Sport in Antalya
21st century in Antalya
Tennis tournaments in Turkey
2005 in Turkish tennis